Jayde Yuk Fun Riviere (born January 22, 2001) is a Canadian soccer player who plays as a defender for Manchester United of the English Women's Super League and the Canada women's national team.

Riviere played college soccer at the University of Michigan before signing her first professional contract with Manchester United in 2023. She represented Canada at multiple youth levels before earning her first senior cap in 2017. In 2021, she won a gold medal at the 2020 Summer Olympics in Tokyo, Japan.

Early life
Born in Markham, Ontario, Riviere was first taught to play soccer by her father when she was three. She started playing club soccer for West Rouge SC at the age of four, later representing Pickering SC before moving to Markham SC aged 13. She attended Bill Crothers Secondary School where she also played volleyball, flag football and track and field, and was named Female Athlete of the Year after scoring 50 goals in just 20 league games in her only year of high school soccer before joining the Ontario REX program. In August 2017, Riviere moved cross country to Burnaby, British Columbia, to join the residency program at the Vancouver Whitecaps Super REX Academy.

College career
Riviere verbally committed to playing college soccer for the Michigan Wolverines at the University of Michigan in 2014. In total, she received 28 full scholarship offers before she enrolled at the Michigan School of Kinesiology in the fall of 2019. She also rejected offers to play professionally in order to attend Michigan. She made her collegiate debut starting in the season opener on August 22, 2019, a 5–0 win over Marshall Thundering Herd. She scored her first and only collegiate goal on November 8, 2019, scoring the overtime winner in a 2–1 victory against the Rutgers Scarlet Knights in the 2019 Big Ten women's soccer tournament semi-final. In her freshman season, she was named to the Big Ten All-Freshman Team. In 2021, she made a career-high 22 appearances on the season and helped lead Michigan to the 2021 Big Ten women's soccer tournament title, the third in team history and first since 1999, as well as a program-tying best NCAA quarter-finals appearance. She made one appearance in the 2022 season, on August 28 against Boston University Terriers, before announcing she would be ending her Michigan career early due to a lower body injury. In total she made 47 appearances for Michigan, registering one goal and three assists.

Club career
In April 2022, Riviere signed with AFC Ann Arbor of the amateur USL W League ahead of the inaugural 2022 USL W League season. She made four appearances during the season.

Despite being touted as a first round pick, Riviere did not declare for the 2023 NWSL Draft amid rumoured interest from European clubs. On January 21, 2023, she signed her first professional contract with English Women's Super League team Manchester United on a two-and-a-half year deal.

International career

Youth
In September 2015, Riviere saw her first involvement with the Canadian youth program as a 14-year-old when Bev Priestman called her up an EXCEL camp with the under-17 team. In March 2016, she was named to her first tournament squad, making four appearances at the 2016 CONCACAF Women's U-17 Championship. Later that year she was part of the roster that finished as runners-up at the 2016 CONCACAF Girls' U-15 Championship, playing in all seven matches and scoring four goals before ending the year with a third tournament appearance, this time at the 2016 FIFA U-17 Women's World Cup, playing in two matches. Having made her senior international debut in 2017, Riviere continued to feature at youth level, representing Canada at three major youth tournaments in 2018; she started the year playing in every match at the 2018 CONCACAF Women's U-20 Championship, finished third at the 2018 CONCACAF Women's U-17 Championship, and ended the year with a run to the 2018 FIFA U-17 Women's World Cup semi-final.

Senior
In November 2017, Riviere was called up to the Canada senior team for the first time for a two-game friendly series against the United States. On November 12, 2017, she made her senior international debut in the second of the two games, entering as a 71st-minute substitute for Adriana Leon in a 3–1 defeat to the United States. She started her first match for the senior team on April 8, 2019, and assisted both goals in a 2–1 friendly win against Nigeria.

In May 2019, she was named to the roster for the 2019 FIFA Women's World Cup in France. Having been an unused substitute for the opening game, she started the next group game, a 2–0 over New Zealand. She made a further two appearances, both as a substitute as Canada was eliminated by Sweden in the quarter-finals.

She scored her first goal for the senior team on January 29, 2020, the sixth goal in a 11–0 win over Saint Kitts and Nevis during the 2020 CONCACAF Women's Olympic Qualifying Championship.

In 2021, Riviere represented Canada at the  2020 Summer Olympics in Tokyo, Japan. An unused substitute for the opening game, Riverie replaced Allysha Chapman as starter in the remaining group stage matches, beating Chile and drawing with Great Britain. Having picked up a yellow card against Brazil in the quarter-final, Riviere was suspended on yellow card accumulation for the semi-final against the United States but returned for the gold medal match, substituting on during overtime as Canada won gold in a penalty shootout victory over Sweden.

Personal life 
Riviere's father was born in Dominica, and her mother was born in Hong Kong. In 2021, Riviere was honoured in her hometown of Markham when Mayor Frank Scarpitti declared August 6 to be "Jayde Riviere Day" in Markham after Canada's gold medal victory at the 2020 Tokyo Olympics.

Career statistics

Club

International

Scores and results list Canada's goal tally first, score column indicates score after each Riviere goal.

Honours
Michigan Wolverines
 Big Ten Conference women's soccer tournament: 2021

Canada
 CONCACAF Girls' U-15 Championship runner-up: 2016
 Summer Olympics gold medal: 2021

Individual
 Big Ten Conference All-Freshman Team: 2017

References

External links
 

2001 births
Living people
Canadian women's soccer players
Women's association football forwards
Canada women's international soccer players
Sportspeople from Markham, Ontario
Canadian people of Dominica descent
Canadian sportspeople of Hong Kong descent
Soccer people from Ontario
2019 FIFA Women's World Cup players
Michigan Wolverines women's soccer players
Black Canadian women's soccer players
Footballers at the 2020 Summer Olympics
Olympic soccer players of Canada
Olympic medalists in football
Medalists at the 2020 Summer Olympics
Olympic gold medalists for Canada
Pickering FC (women) players
AFC Ann Arbor players
Manchester United W.F.C. players
Expatriate women's footballers in England
Canadian expatriate sportspeople in England
Canadian expatriate women's soccer players
Expatriate women's soccer players in the United States
Canadian expatriate sportspeople in the United States